Lewis Hamilton is a British racing driver. Throughout his career in the grassroots categories, he won the Formula Renault 2.0 UK Championship (2003), Bahrain Superprix (2004), Formula 3 Euro Series Championship (2005), the Masters of Formula 3 Race (2005) and GP2 Series Championship (2006). In his Formula 1 career, Hamilton has won seven world titles a record shared with German driver Michael Schumacher. He also holds other records, as well as most career wins, most pole positions, most podium finishes, most career points, most laps led. As Hamilton debuted in the  season, he became the first and only black driver in Formula One.

Formula One

World titles

Grand Prix wins

Podiums

Pole positions

Records

GP2 Series

Wins

Podiums

Awards
 Autosport British Club Driver of the Year: 2003
 Autosport Rookie of the Year: 2006, 2007
 Autosport International Racing Driver Award: 2007, 2008, 2014, 2015, 2017, 2018, 2019, 2020
 Autosport British Competition Driver of the Year: 2007, 2013, 2014, 2015, 2016, 2017, 2018, 2022
GQ Sportsman of the Year: 2007, 2014, 2015
Segrave Trophy for Unprecedented Achievements in Debut Season in the FIA Formula One World Championship: 2007
BRDC Gold Star Award, Era Club Trophy, Graham Hill Trophy, Richard Seaman Trophy: 2007
Bild am Sonntag Golden Steering Wheel for Outstanding Achievement: 2007
Square Mile Sports Awards ICAP Sportsperson of the Year: 2007
SJA British Sports Awards Best International Newcomer: 2007
SJA British Sports Awards Sportsman of the Year: 2007, 2020
BBC East Sports Personality of the Year: 2007
Confartigianato Motori Best Driver Award: 2007
Autocar Motorsport Award: 2007, 2021
Pride of Britain Award: 2007
 Bambi Award (Special Jury Prize): 2008
Laureus World Sports Award for Breakthrough of the Year: 2008
BRDC Gold Star Award, Era Club Trophy, Graham Hill Trophy, Richard Seaman Trophy, John Cobb Trophy: 2008
BRDC John Cobb Trophy: 2009
BRDC Chris Bristow Trophy, Graham Hill Trophy: 2010
Confartigianato Motori Best Driver Award: 2011
BRDC Era Club Trophy: 2012
BRDC Gold Star Award, Richard Seaman Trophy: 2013
BRDC Gold Star Award, Graham Hill Trophy, Richard Seaman Trophy, Johnny Wakefield Trophy: 2014
PAP European Sportsperson of the Year: 2014, 2019
BBC Sports Personality of the Year: 2014, 2020
BRDC Gold Star Award, Graham Hill Trophy, Johnny Wakefield Trophy: 2015
British Ethnic Diversity Sports Awards Lycamobile Sportsman of the Year: 2016
Confartigianato Motori Best Driver Award: 2016
BRDC Gold Star Award: 2016
BRDC Gold Star Award, Johnny Wakefield Trophy: 2017
FIA Hall of Fame induction: 2017
 Best Driver ESPY Award: 2017, 2021
Gazzetta World Sportsman of the Year: 2018, 2020
SJA British Sports Awards Chairman's Award: 2018
BRDC Special Gold Star Award, Gold Star Award, Graham Hill Trophy: 2018
PETA Person of the Year: 2018
BRDC Special Gold Star Award, Gold Star Award, Graham Hill Trophy, Johnny Wakefield Trophy: 2019
 Honorary Fellow of the Royal Academy of Engineering: 2019
GQ Germany Creativity & Design Award: 2019
PETA Menswear Collaboration Award: 2019
PETA Libby Award: 2019
 Laureus World Sportsman of the Year: 2020
 L'Équipe Champion of Champions: 2020
British GQ Game Changer of the Year: 2020
GQ India International Man of the Year: 2020
Automobile Club d'Italia Trophy: 2020 
Sport Bild Star of the Year: 2020
FIA President Award: 2020
FIA Personality of the Year: 2014, 2018, 2020, 2021
Laureus Athlete Advocate of the Year: 2021
WSJ. Magazine Innovators Award: 2021
FIA  Action of the Year: 2022

See also
Hamilton–Rosberg rivalry
List of Formula One driver records

References

Career achievements
Career achievements of Formula One drivers